Chehalis was a sternwheel steamboat that ran on the Chehalis River, Puget Sound, and Lake Washington from 1867 to 1882.  This vessel should not be confused with other steam vessels named Chehalis.

Career
Chehalis was built at Tumwater, Washington in 1867 by H.H. Hyde.  The engines for Chehalis came from the Fraser River sternwheeler Henrietta, which had been built at Victoria in 1859.  For nearly three years following construction, the owners of Chehalis tried to compete on Grays Harbor and the Chehalis River.  This proved unsuccessful, and so the vessel was returned to Puget Sound where it proved more profitable.  Chehalis was first put on the route between Snohomish, Port Gamble, and Port Ludlow.

Chehalis was later sold to the Black Diamond Coal Mining Company of California, which was operating mines in the Black Diamond area south of Lake Washington.  Under Captain Huffner and  Capt. William Bailey (1822–1882), Chehalis was used to tow barges on the lake.  (Captain Bailey was later killed in a dock accident at Yesler Wharf.)

Capt J.C. Brittain and Capt. Thomas Brennan then bought Chehalis and ran the vessel on the Skagit River.  Chehalis was the first vessel to go up the Skagit as far as Portage Rapids, and the first to ascend the Sauk River.  The vessel was in charge of captains Daniel Benson, Curtis D. Brownfield, and Robert Bailey while on the Skagit River.  Chehalis was also run on the Seattle-Olympia route under Capt. Hiram Olney.

Wrecked

In November 1882, under the command of Capt. W.F. Munroe, Chehalis was caught in a gale en route from Snohomish to Seattle.  The vessel became unmanageable, and was blown ashore stern first near Ten Mile Point.  Chehalis was a total loss, and her cargo was strewn along ten miles of the shore.

Notes

References 
 Affleck, Edward L., A Century of Paddlewheelers in the Pacific Northwest, the Yukon, and Alaska, Alexander Nicolls Press, Vancouver, BC 2000 
 Newell, Gordon R., Ships of the Inland Sea, Superior Publishing Co., Seattle, WA (2nd Ed. 1960)
 

1867 ships
Steamboats of Grays Harbor and Chehalis and Hoquiam Rivers
Sternwheelers of Washington (state)
Steamboats of Lake Washington
History of King County, Washington